The Le Rhône 9C is a nine-cylinder rotary aircraft engine produced in France by  Société des Moteurs Le Rhône / Gnome et Rhône. Also known as the Le Rhône 80 hp in a reference to its nominal power rating, the engine was fitted to a number of military aircraft types of the First World War. Le Rhône 9C engines were also produced under license in Germany, Sweden and Great Britain by various companies, and in the United States. The Swedish version built by AB Thulinverken was designated Thulin A. German production and development was carried out by Oberursel Moterwerken as the UR.I.

Design and development
In common with other Le Rhône series engines, the 9C featured copper induction pipes and used a single push-pull rod to operate its two overhead valves. Unlike later engines, these were located on the front of the engine.

Examples of Le Rhône 9C engines are on view in aviation museums either installed in aircraft exhibits or as stand-alone displays. A few examples of the 9C engine remain airworthy both in Europe and North America, one powering a vintage Sopwith Pup biplane in England, and a small number of others having powered reproduction WW I-era aircraft at Old Rhinebeck Aerodrome and other American "living" aviation museums that fly their restored original engines in both similarly restored original, and airworthy reproduction period aircraft.

Applications

Survivors
Both the restored Shuttleworth Collection's airworthy Sopwith Pup and the 1960s-built reproduction Pup of the Owl's Head Transportation Museum (originally from Old Rhinebeck Aerodrome) are each powered by 80 hp Le Rhône 9C rotary engines, and fly regularly throughout the summer months.
An operative Le Rhone 9C is shown at the Museo Nacional de Aeronautica in Buenos Aires Argentina.

Engines on display
A Le Rhône 9C is installed in the Sopwith Pup on display at the Royal Air Force Museum London. After renovation this aircraft flew for a brief period in the 1970s and is now retired.
 a Le Rhône 9C is on public display at the Aerospace Museum of California
 a Le Rhône 9C is on public display at The Hangar Flight Museum

Specifications (Le Rhône 9C)

See also

References

Notes

Bibliography

 Lumsden, Alec. British Piston Engines and their Aircraft. Marlborough, Wiltshire: Airlife Publishing, 2003. .
 Gunston, Bill. World Encyclopedia of Aero Engines. Cambridge, England. Patrick Stephens Limited, 1989.

External links

Le Rhône rotary engine - Images and description

Air-cooled aircraft piston engines
1910s aircraft piston engines
9C
Rotary aircraft piston engines